Fred sjunger Bellman (English: Fred sings Bellman) is an album by the Swedish folk singer-songwriter and guitar player Fred Åkerström and contains his interpretations of Carl Michael Bellman.  The LP was released in 1969; it was re-released on CD and LP in 1990.

Track listing
Songs and lyrics from Fredmans Epistlar by Carl Michael Bellman:

 Epistle Nr 3: Fader Berg i hornet stöter
 Epistle Nr 23: Ack Du Min Moder
 Epistle Nr 24: Kära Syster, Mig Nu Lyster
 Epistle Nr 30: Drick Ur Ditt Glas
 Epistle Nr 34: Ack Vad För En Usel Koja
 Epistle Nr 35: Bröderna Fara Väl Vilse Ibland
 Epistle Nr 51: Movitz Blåste en Konsert
 Epistle Nr 69: Se Dansmästarn
 Epistle Nr 80: Liksom En Herdinna
 Epistle Nr 81: Märk Hur Vår Skugga

References

1969 albums
Fred Åkerström albums
Swedish-language albums
Carl Michael Bellman